The National Park Service has designated eleven National Natural Landmarks in Massachusetts. Most of these are bogs, swamps, wetlands and old-growth forest.

See also
 List of Massachusetts state parks

References

External links
 National Park Service, National Natural Landmarks - Massachusetts

Massachusetts
National Natural Landmarks